The dorsal venous arch of the foot is a superficial vein that connects the small saphenous vein and the great saphenous vein.  Anatomically, it is defined by where the dorsal veins of the first and fifth digit, respectively, meet the great saphenous vein and small saphenous vein.

It is usually fairly easy to palpate and visualize (if the patient is barefoot).  It lies superior to the metatarsal  bones approximately midway between the ankle joint and metatarsal phalangeal joints.

Additional images

External links
 

Veins of the lower limb